"Mindflux" is a song by the British dance outfit N-Joi, released in 1991. The single, despite being released in the United Kingdom, only charted in the United States on Billboards Hot Dance Club Play chart, reaching number one in 1992, giving the act its first of two number ones on this chart, the other coming from the act's first hit, 1990's "Anthem", which was re-released in 1996 as "The New Anthem". The music video for the single, in which the duo are performing in a concert, featured singer/actress Saffron and a male both dancing on stage.

"Mindflux" was used in music intros for BET's Video Vibrations in the United States from 1992 to 1997.

Track listing
 12", CD (US)
"Mindflux" (6:41) 	
"Malfunction" (4:20) 	
"Phoenix" (4:49) 	
"Rhythm Zone" (5:27)

Charts

References

External links
Original music video for "Mindflux" from YouTube

1990 songs
1991 singles
1992 singles
Deconstruction Records singles
House music songs
RCA Records singles
Techno songs